Acleris tibetica is a species of moth of the family Tortricidae. It is found in Tibet.

References

Moths described in 1964
tibetica
Moths of Asia
Fauna of Tibet